Fenger is a surname. Notable people with the surname include:

Christian Fenger (1840–1902), Danish-born surgeon, pathologist, and medical instructor
Hans Fenger undertook The Langley Schools Music Project, a collection of recordings of children's choruses singing pop hits
Johanne Fenger (1836–1913), Danish composer
Ludvig Fenger (1833–1905), Danish architect
Mads Fenger (born 1990), Danish professional football defender
Michael Fenger (born 1962), former Danish handball player who competed in the 1984 Summer Olympics
Jakob Fenger-Larsen (born 1971), Danish association football player

See also
Fenger Academy High School (Chicago), public 4–year high school located in Chicago, Illinois, United States
Finger (disambiguation)
Feininger
Feng (disambiguation)
Frengers